Associação Beneditense de Cultura e Desporto is a Portuguese sports club from Benedita.

The men's football team plays in the AF Leiria I Série B. The club enjoyed stints on the third tier while it was named Segunda Divisão B; from 1994 to 2000 and in 2001–02. The subsequent stint on the fourth tier ended in 2006, in addition to a one-off stint in 2012–13. In the Taça de Portugal, the team reached the fourth round in 2002–03.

References

Football clubs in Portugal
Association football clubs established in 1962
1962 establishments in Portugal